Kosmos 2442 ( meaning Cosmos 2442) is one of a set of three set of three Russian military satellites launched in 2008 as part of the GLONASS satellite navigation system. It was launched with Kosmos 2443 and Kosmos 2444.

This satellites is a GLONASS-M satellite, also known as Uragan-M, and is numbered Uragan-M No. 724.

Kosmos 2442/3/4 were launched from Site 81/23 at Baikonur Cosmodrome in Kazakhstan. A Proton-M carrier rocket with a Blok DM upper stage was used to perform the launch which took place at 08:49 UTC on 25 September 2008. The launch successfully placed the satellites into Medium Earth orbit. It subsequently received its Kosmos designation, and the international designators 2008-046A. The United States Space Command assigned it the Satellite Catalog Number 33378.

It is currently part of the GLONASS constellation in the third orbital plane, orbital slot 18. It started operation on 26 October 2008.

See also
List of Kosmos satellites (2251–2500)
List of Proton launches (2000–2009)

References

Spacecraft launched in 2008
Spacecraft launched by Proton rockets
Kosmos satellites